"Rockstar" is a song by American Rock band Poison it was released as the first single from their then upcoming album Hollyweird. The song was first released as a digital download single on May 27, 2001 and then as a CD single in May 2002.
The lyrics were written by Bret Michaels and C.C. DeVille.

Live performance
"Rockstar" has been performed 20 times by the band in concert. Its first performance was on May 27, 2001. It was a regular in the setlist on the Glam, Slam, Metal, Jam Tour, but only played once on the Hollyweird World Tour.

Personnel
Bret Michaels - lead vocals, rhythm guitar, keyboards
C.C. DeVille - lead guitar, backing vocals
Bobby Dall - bass, backing vocals
Rikki Rockett - drums, backing vocals

References

2001 singles
Poison (American band) songs
2001 songs